Isabel Ingram Mayer, née Ingram (March 7, 1902 – 1988) was an American tutor to Wanrong, the empress consort of China of Puyi, the last emperor of China.

Early life
Born 7 March 1902, in Beijing, Ingram was the daughter of American Congregational missionary James Henry Ingram (1858-1934) and Myrtle Belle (Prough) Ingram (1871-1941), his second wife. Her passport and a New York Times article (cited below) give her sisters as Miriam Ingram and Ruth Ingram. Other siblings were Kathryn Ingram (Rowe), Robert Ingram, and Lewis Ingram.

Tutor to Wanrong in the Forbidden City
Ingram graduated from Wellesley College, Wellesley, Massachusetts, United States, in 1922, she returned to China, was admitted into the Forbidden City and became Wanrong's tutor in the same year. Wanrong married Puyi in December 1922 and became the last empress of China.

Accounts of Isabel Ingram in Richard Halliburton, The New York Times and Time

Famous in his era, travel-adventure writer Richard Halliburton wrote his parents in December 1922, saying that he called on "the young American tutoress of the Empress of China."  He added that he found the visit quite interesting. The young Ingram was petite and quite attractive. He wrote that on Christmas Eve he "went for a walk about the city wall with Miss Ingram," and also said that "the Royal Pair were only married a day or two before," adding that "this girl" and Reginald Johnston, Pu Yi's tutor, were the only people of European stock "at the great ceremony." In his book The Royal Road to Romance, he wrote that the empress was not to be outdone by the emperor with his tutor, and that Ingram taught her the speech, modes, and manners of the West. The two girls tried to look like one another and traded clothes on at least one occasion. 

A 21 November 1934 New York Times article states that the empress received part of her education from two American women. It names the women as Miriam Ingram and Isabel Ingram, and says they are daughters of a Congregational missionary from Philadelphia. The article further explains that from them the empress learned English, history, and something about life in the Western world.

On 12 May 1924, Time magazine had a piece titled "Henry The Democrat," "Henry" referring to a name adopted by Puyi, who, according to Time had a "beautiful consort" with the court name, Elizabeth (Wanrong). The article states, "Elizabeth was accompanied by Miss Isabel Ingram, graduate of Wellesley, her American tutor."

Scholarly writing
As a reflection of her interest in Chinese art and culture, for The Pennsylvania Museum Bulletin she wrote "A Scroll of the Eight Views by Chang Lung Chang" as well as "The Siren Collection of Chinese Sculpture," both between 1927 and 1929.

Passport data
According to Ingram's American passport, in case of death or accident she wished that a sister Ruth Ingram be notified at Peking Union Medical College.

A note on Ingram's passport reads, "Travelling to British ports, Egypt, Palestine, and the United Kingdom en route to the United States of America. British Consulate, Peking. 23/2/27." On 12 April 1927, it was stamped by the harbour police in Ceylon. It bears other stamps, including Italy, Singapore, Greece, and Port Said. In 1928, she returned to China. At the time of her father's death in 1934, she lived in Edgewood, Maryland with her husband, William Mayer, a captain in the United States Army.

References

American expatriates in China
1902 births
1988 deaths
Writers from Beijing
People from Edgewood, Maryland